The Estonian Figure Skating Championships are a figure skating national championship held annually to determine the national champions of Estonia. Medals may be awarded in the disciplines of men's singles, ladies' singles, pair skating, and ice dancing on the senior, junior, and novice levels.

History
The Estonian Championships were first held in Tallinn in 1917; Johannes Johanson won the men's category (four competitors), Hilda Laane won the women's title, and Hilda Laane / Johannes Johanson took the pairs' event (four pairs).

During the Soviet occupation and annexation (1940–91), some Estonians competed at the Soviet Championships. In 1991, after the restoration of independence, the Estonian Skating Union was founded and admitted as a provisional member of the International Skating Union.

Senior medalists

Men

Women

Pairs

Ice dancing

Junior medalists

Men

Women

Pairs

Ice dancing

Novice medalists

Men

Women

Ice dancing

Discontinued events
These events were held only in the years indicated.

Synchronized skating

Senior

Junior

Most championships

Men

Ladies

References

External links
 Estonian Skating Union 
 Results at ESBL 

 
Figure skating national championships
Figure skating in Estonia
Figure skating
Recurring sporting events established in 1917
1917 establishments in Estonia